Johnny Ike "John" Sutton (born November 13, 1952) is former Major League Baseball pitcher.

Sutton was selected by the Texas Rangers in the third round (48th overall) of the January primary phase of the 1974 MLB Draft. He was traded from the Rangers to the Cardinals for Mike Wallace on October 22, 1976. He was picked by the Twins from the Cardinals in the Rule 5 draft on December 5, 1977.

References

External links

1952 births
Living people
Baseball players from Dallas
St. Louis Cardinals players
Minnesota Twins players
Panola Ponies baseball players
American expatriate baseball players in Mexico
Chattanooga Lookouts players
Gastonia Rangers players
Hawaii Islanders players
Iowa Oaks players
New Orleans Pelicans (baseball) players
Ogden A's players
Oklahoma City 89ers players
Pittsfield Rangers players
Sacramento Solons players
Salt Lake City Gulls players
Sultanes de Monterrey players
Tecolotes de Nuevo Laredo players
Toledo Mud Hens players